Ennai Vittu Pogaathe is a 1988 Indian Tamil-language drama film, directed by T. K. Bose, starring Ramarajan and Sabitha Anand. It was released on 8 July 1988.

Plot

Cast 

Ramarajan as Vijaya
Sabitha Anand as Lakshmi
S. S. Chandran
Senthil
 Rasi as Sindhu
S. N. Lakshmi
R. Dilip
Chinni Jayanth
Radha Ravi

Soundtrack 

The music was composed by Ilaiyaraaja.

Reception 
The Indian Express wrote, "There is something near to life in the mother-son relationship portrayed in Ennai Vittu Poagathe [...] The film has well-tuned, meaningful songs, thanks to Ilayaraja".

References

External links 
 

1980s Tamil-language films
1988 drama films
1988 films
Films scored by Ilaiyaraaja
Indian drama films